Hamilton Highway is a rural highway in western Victoria, Australia, linking Geelong and the town of Hamilton, through the localities of Inverleigh, Cressy, Lismore, Derrinallum, Darlington, Mortlake, and Penshurst. Glenelg Highway links Hamilton across the South Australian border to Mount Gambier, making Hamilton Highway a popular alternative Melbourne-Mount Gambier route (being roughly 50 km shorter than a corresponding journey via the Victorian coast along Highway 1).

History
The passing of the Highways and Vehicles Act of 1924 through the Parliament of Victoria provided for the declaration of State Highways, roads two-thirds financed by the State government through the Country Roads Board (later VicRoads). The Hamilton Highway was declared a State Highway in the 1959/60 financial year, from Geelong via Cressy and Mortlake to Hamilton (for a total of 143 miles); before this declaration, this road was referred to as the Geelong-Hamilton Road.

The Geelong end of the highway was once routed along Hyland Street through Fyansford, until the construction of Deviation Road between 1931-32 with unemployment labour during the Great Depression. Opened in 1933, it was cut into the hillside, the surface was originally of concrete construction. The road opened 54 years after the first petition by Fyansford residents for such a road.

A new bridge over Woady Yaloak River in Cressy was opened in 1995, at a cost of $2.86 million, adjacent to and replacing a structure built in 1854 and rebuilt in 1880 after fire damage, retained but now closed to vehicular traffic.

The Hamilton Highway was signed as State Route 106 between Geelong and Hamilton in 1986; with Victoria's conversion to the newer alphanumeric system in the late 1990s, this was replaced by route B140.

The passing of the Road Management Act 2004 granted the responsibility of overall management and development of Victoria's major arterial roads to VicRoads: in 2004, VicRoads re-declared the road as Hamilton Highway (Arterial #6780), beginning at Latrobe Terrace at Geelong and ending at Glenelg Highway in Hamilton.

Major Intersections and Towns

See also

 Highways in Australia
 Highways in Victoria

References

External links

Highways in Victoria (Australia)
Transport in Geelong
Transport in Barwon South West (region)